Lundin is a Swedish surname. Notable people with the surname include:

 Adolf H. Lundin (1932–2006), Swedish oil and mining entrepreneur
 Albin Lundin (born 1996), Swedish ice hockey player
 Alexander Lundin (born 1992), Swedish footbalplayer
 Alva Lundin (1889-1972), Swedish title card and credit designer and artist
 Anders Lundin (born 1958), Swedish television host
 Andrew Peter Lundin III (1944–2001), nephrologist
 Andreas Petrus Lundin (1869–1929), Swedish marine engineer
 Augusta Lundin (1840–1919), Swedish fashion designer
 Bert Lundin (1921–2018), Swedish union leader
 Cody Lundin (born 1967), American survivalist
 Deanne Lundin, American poet
 Erik Lundin (1904–1988), Swedish chess master
 Frederick Lundin (1868–1947), American politician
 Fredrik Lundin (born 1963), Danish jazz saxophonist, composer and bandleader
 Göran Lundin (born 1950), Swedish author
 Hjalmar Lundin ((1870–1941), Swedish wrestler
 Hulda Lundin (1847–1921), Swedish tailor
 Ian Lundin (born 1960), Swedish billionaire
 Kristian Lundin (born 1973), Swedish composer, music producer and songwriter
 Lova Lundin (born 1995), Swedish footballer
 Lukas Lundin (1958–2022), Swedish billionaire
 Marietta de Pourbaix-Lundin (born 1951), Swedish politician
 Marika Bergman-Lundin (born 1999), Swedish football player
 Mike Lundin (born 1984), American ice hockey player
 Morgan Lundin, Swedish archer
 Pål Lundin (born 1964), Swedish football player
 Peter Lundin (born 1971), Danish criminal
 Roger Lundin, Swedish football manager
 Sofie Lundin (born 2000), Swedish ice hockey player
 Stefan Lundin (born 1955), Swedish football player and manager
 Sten Lundin (1931–2016), Swedish motocross racer
 Tage Lundin (born 1933), Swedish biathlon competitor
 Therese Lundin (footballer) (born 1979), Swedish footballer
 Therèse Lundin (swimmer) (born 1970), Swedish swimmer
 Thomas Lundin, Swedish football manager
 Thomas de Lundin, 13th-century Scottish nobleman
 Ulf Lundin (born 1965), Swedish artist
 Victor Lundin (1930–2013), American character actor

See also
 de Lundin, surname of an old Norman noble family

Places
 Lundin Links, Fife, Scotland, United Kingdom
 Lundin Peak, a summit in Washington state
 Lundin's Neck, a mountain pass in Lesotho

Companies
 Carson and Lundin, a former architectural firm
 Lundin Mining, a copper, zinc, and nickel mining company
 Lundin Petroleum, a petroleum company

Swedish-language surnames